Edmundo Joaquim Pascoal da Silva (born 12 October 1963), known simply as Edmundo, is a Portuguese retired footballer who played as a central defender.

He amassed Primeira Liga totals of 227 games and five goals during 11 seasons, five of those with Vitória de Setúbal.

Club career
Born in Setúbal, Edmundo spent four Primeira Liga seasons with hometown club Vitória FC, after which he signed with S.L. Benfica in 1986. Following a 1–7 away loss against Sporting CP in a Lisbon derby in December, he replaced António Oliveira and partnered Dito for the rest of the season, but lost his starting position after the arrival of Carlos Mozer.

Edmundo returned to Setúbal on a loan deal in 1988 in a move involving Hernâni Neves, later joining C.F. Os Belenenses in the same situation and agreeing to a permanent contract with the latter at the end of the campaign. Having alternated between the top division and the second level in the following years, also representing C.F. Estrela da Amadora and C.D. Beja, he closed out his career at nearly 35 after a spell in the lower leagues with Grupo União Sport Montemor.

International career
Edmundo played three times for Portugal at under-21 level during the qualifying stage for the 1986 UEFA European Championship.

Honours
Benfica
 Primeira Liga: 1986–87
 Taça de Portugal: 1986–87
 European Cup: Runner-up 1987–88

References

External links
 
 

1963 births
Living people
Sportspeople from Setúbal
Portuguese footballers
Association football defenders
Primeira Liga players
Liga Portugal 2 players
Segunda Divisão players
Vitória F.C. players
S.L. Benfica footballers
C.F. Os Belenenses players
C.F. Estrela da Amadora players
C.D. Beja players
União Montemor players
Portugal under-21 international footballers
Portuguese football managers